Khadalgobra is a census town in Ramnagar I CD block in Contai subdivision of Purba Medinipur district in the state of West Bengal, India.

Geography

Location

Urbanisation
93.55% of the population of Contai subdivision live in the rural areas. Only 6.45% of the population live in the urban areas and it is considerably behind Haldia subdivision in urbanization, where 20.81% of the population live in urban areas.

Note: The map alongside presents some of the notable locations in the subdivision. All places marked in the map are linked in the larger full screen map.

Demographics
As per 2011 Census of India Khadalgobra had a total population of 5,344 of which 2,736 (51%) were males and 2,608 (49%) were females. Population below 6 years was 574. The total number of literates in Khadalgobra was 4,074 (85.41% of the population over 6 years).

Infrastructure
As per the District Census Handbook 2011, Khadalgobra covered an area of 2.1858 km2. It had the facility of a railway station at New Digha close by and bus routes in the town. Amongst the civic amenities it had 550 domestic electric connections. Amongst the educational facilities it had were 2 primary schools and 1 middle school. The nearest secondary school and senior secondary school are at South Simulia 1.5 km away. The nearest degree college was at Depal 14 km away.

Transport
Khadalgobra is on National Highway 116B.

References

Cities and towns in Purba Medinipur district